Vitali Tajbert (born 25 May 1982) is a German former professional boxer who competed from 2005 to 2013. He held the WBC super-featherweight title in 2010 (having held the interim title from 2009 to 2010) and the European Union title in 2008. As an amateur, he won a silver medal at the 2003 World Championships, a gold medal at the 2004 European Championships, and a bronze medal at the 2004 Summer Olympics, all in the featherweight division.

Amateur results
1999 won a bronze medal at the Junior European Championships in Rijeka, Croatia at Bantamweight.
2000 won the gold medal at the Junior World Championships in Budapest at Bantamweight.
Defeated Yuguang Zhang (China) RSC-2
Defeated Yusni Barzaga (Cuba) PTS (27-13)
Defeated Yevgeni Kybalyuk (Ukraine) PTS (19-8)
Defeated Haruyton Tovmasyan (Armenia) PTS (15-6)
Defeated Murat Chrachev (Russia) PTS (23-3)
2001 represented Germany at the 2001 World Amateur Boxing Championships in Belfast at Bantamweight.
Lost to Afansy Poskachine (Russia) PTS (9-10)
2002 represented Germany at the European Championships in Perm, Russia. Result was:
Lost to Waldemar Cucereanu (Romania) PTS (15-29)
2003 won the silver medal at the 2003 World Amateur Boxing Championships in Bangkok at Featherweight.
Defeated Cheng Tong Shou (China) RSCI
Defeated Bekzod Chidrov (Uzbekistan) PTS (26-14)
Defeated Oleg Jefimovich (Ukraine) PTS (35-19)
Defeated Abdusalom Khasanov (Tajikistan) PTS (19-17)
Lost to Galib Jafarov (Kazachstan) PTS (35-43)
2004 won the gold medal at the European Championships 2004 in Pula, Croatia at Featherweight.
Defeated Sedat Tasci (Turkey) PTS (48-13)
Defeated Viorel Simion (Romania) PTS (65-41)
Defeated Mikhail Bernadski (Belarus) PTS (45-24)
Defeated Khedafi Djelkhir (France) RSCO-3
2004 won a bronze medal representing Germany at the 2004 Summer Olympics in Athens at Featherweight.
Defeated Daniel Brizuela (Argentina) RSCO-3
Defeated Khedafi Djelkhir (France) PTS (40-26)
Defeated Luis Franco (Cuba) PTS (34-26)
Lost to Song Guk Kim (North Korea) PTS (24-29)
2005 won the gold medal at the Military World Championships in Pretoria at Featherweight.
Defeated V. Anghel (Romania) PTS (24-5)
Defeated Y. Uruzbayev (Kazachstan) PTS (24-12)
Defeated Thongtheang Khlongchan (Thailand) PTS (30-28)
Defeated Sergej Ignatyev (Russia) PTS (25-14)

Professional career

Vitali turned professional in 2005 and compiled a record of 18-1 before facing and defeating Mexican boxer Humberto Mauro Gutiérrez, to win the WBC interim Super Featherweight title. Tajbert was promoted to full champion after Humberto Soto won the WBC lightweight title. Tajbert lost the title in his second defence to Japanese boxer Takahiro Ao.

Professional boxing record

Personal life
Tajbert and his family migrated from Kazakhstan as ethnic Germans to Stuttgart in 1992.

See also
List of world super-featherweight boxing champions

References

External links

Website of Vitali Tajbert
News and Pictures of Vitali Tajbert

1982 births
Living people
German male boxers
Olympic boxers of Germany
Olympic bronze medalists for Germany
Boxers at the 2004 Summer Olympics
Olympic medalists in boxing
Kazakhstani emigrants to Germany
Russian and Soviet-German people
Kazakhstani people of German descent
Medalists at the 2004 Summer Olympics
AIBA World Boxing Championships medalists
Featherweight boxers
Super-featherweight boxers
World super-featherweight boxing champions
World Boxing Council champions